Keith Begley is an Irish sports psychologist and Gaelic football manager. He has worked with the Carlow senior hurling team, the Clare senior football team and Cuala's senior hurlers. He has also led the Offaly minor football team.

An accredited sports psychologist with the Sport Ireland Institute and a former physical education teacher, he is often referenced in the national media.

References

External links
 Keith Begley at Elite Performance Psychology

Year of birth missing (living people)
Living people
Carlow county hurling team
Clare county football team
Irish schoolteachers
Sports psychologists